This is a list of presidents of Lebanon since the creation of the office in 1926. 

Constitutionally (de jure), the president's post carries significant responsibilities and influence. In practice, the president is largely a ceremonial and symbolic post due to external pressure (such as Syrian influence) or the formation of "consensus" cabinets, forcing the president to compromise. In theory, however, the president is responsible for appointing the entire government, therefore the ministers should work to his pleasure. Nevertheless, the president is still able to exercise influence on policy-making and has the role, in conjunction with the prime minister, of choosing ministers in the Government and safeguarding the constitution.

National Pact
Though it is not specifically stated in the constitution, an unwritten understanding known as the National Pact, agreed in 1943, has resulted in the holder of the post being a Maronite Christian in every electoral cycle since that time.

List of officeholders

State of Greater Lebanon, part of the French Mandate (1926–1943)

Lebanese Republic (1943–present)

References

 
Lebanon
Presidents
Lebanon politics-related lists